Douglas County is a county located in the north central portion of the U.S. state of Georgia. As of the 2020 U.S. Census, the population was 144,237, having more than doubled since 1990. The county seat is Douglasville. Douglas County is included in the Atlanta-Sandy Springs-Roswell, GA Metropolitan Statistical Area. It has attracted new residents as jobs have increased in the Atlanta area.

History
Name
The county was created during Reconstruction after the American Civil War. The Georgia General Assembly named it after Stephen A. Douglas, an Illinois senator and the Democratic opponent of Abraham Lincoln in the presidential election of 1860.  The existing historical marker says:

Historical Marker:

County seat
The act creating Douglas County provided that in November 1870, voters of the new county would elect county officers, and vote to select the site of the county seat. In the election, some voters chose a site near the center of the county, but a larger number voted for the settlement known as "Skinned Chestnut" or "Skin(t) Chestnut," based on a Creek Indian landmark tree. The courthouse commissioners chose this site as county seat and proceeded to sell lots and build a courthouse. It later changed its name to Douglasville.

A group of citizens filed suit against the commissioners. The case ultimately went to the Supreme Court of Georgia, which ruled against the commissioners. Both sides agreed to postpone further action until the route of the Georgia Western Railroad through Douglas County was determined. The General Assembly enacted legislation on Feb. 28, 1874, directing that an election be held on Apr. 7, 1874, to determine the location of the county seat—but with the provision that the site be located on the Georgia Western Railroad. In the election, voters confirmed Douglasville as the county seat. On Feb. 25, 1875, the General Assembly incorporated Douglasville.

Geography

Andy Mountain, between Villa Rica and Winston – west of Douglasville along Bankhead Highway, has the highest elevation in Douglas County.

Douglas County sits in Georgia's Piedmont region, which makes its elevation vary due to many rolling hills that Douglas County sits on near the tail end of the Appalachian Mountains. There are no high mountain peaks in Douglas County, just a range of ridges, hills and valleys.

The entirety of Douglas County is located in the Middle Chattahoochee River-Lake Harding sub-basin of the ACF River Basin (Apalachicola-Chattahoochee-Flint River Basin).

Bodies of water
 The Chattahoochee River borders the county to the east and southeast.
 Sweetwater Creek runs in the eastern side of the county in the Lithia Springs area.  The USGS stream gauge (NWS identifier AUSG1) at Lithia Springs is considered to be "near Austell" by the National Weather Service, however, even though that city is further away and in Cobb and not Douglas.
 George Sparks Reservoir makes its home at Sweetwater Creek State Park.
 The Dog River is a small, almost creek like river in the western side of Douglas county and travels south and eastward until it ends at the Dog River Reservoir in the southern part of the county.
 The Dog River Reservoir is Douglas County's main source of drinking water, and also serves as a recreational lake for residents of the county.
All of these had massive flooding during the 2009 Atlanta floods.

Climate

Douglas County has been experiencing numerous natural disasters over the most recent decades. Being located in the South Eastern United States the county experiences strong storms and tornadoes often because of its location in Dixie Alley.

A tornado touched down in the city of Douglasville on March 7, 2008, damaging many homes and ripping one home in half in the Brookmont subdivision on Chapel Hill Road. Arbor Place Mall also reported broken windows from the storm. The tornado also damaged the Chapel Hill Kroger grocery store and threw a heavy air conditioning unit onto cars below. There was only one injury reported from the storm.

Another tornado touched down in Douglas County on May 11, 2008, known as the "Mother's Day Tornado".  The EF2 tornado caused damage all over the county. The tornado touched down in the Fairplay area and moved through the rest of the county. The tornado packing wind speeds up to  downed many trees and damaged many homes in the county. A gas station in Douglasville was destroyed by the storm, with the large roof being thrown onto the street. No injuries or deaths were reported. The governor of Georgia declared a state of emergency for Douglas County and many other counties in the state on May 12, 2008. This is the first time in history that two tornados have touched down in Douglas County in the same year.

The county has suffered through numerous ice storms throughout the years. The ice storms bring everything to a stand still in the area due to the lack of equipment to deal with the problem and drastic amounts of power outages. Some of the worst ice storms were in 1938, 1994, 1998, 2000, 2005, and 2010.

In 2007 the county suffered one of the worst droughts in the area's history, causing a complete watering ban and resulting in the largest wildfire in Georgia history. The fire was located in south east Georgia, but it still affected the county with smoke often through the life of the fire.

In 2005 Hurricane Katrina's remnants tore through the area spawning tornadoes, causing wind damage, and flooding rains. Katrina killed 2 people in Georgia

Sunday night on January 9, 2011, right after Douglasville's first white Christmas in decades, a snowstorm developed over Douglas County and caused as much as 8 inches of snow in the area. The storm closed grocery stores, the courthouse, and Arbor Place Mall until that Wednesday January 12. Schools were closed the entire second week of January.

The "Storm of the Century" (1993) in March 1993 brought  to Douglasville, with drifts measuring several feet.

On September 21, 2009, Douglas County was devastated by the worst flood in Georgia history. Over  of rain fell in one night causing many roads to be destroyed and many homes a total loss. The county was later declared a disaster area, and the governor of Georgia declared a state of emergency. The floodings worst affected areas were in the areas of Douglasville, Villa Rica, Austell, Lithia Springs, and Chapel Hill. The disaster killed more than eight people in the county, most of them in the Douglasville area. The Austell death toll was also high but it was reported in the Cobb County losses.

Adjacent counties
 Cobb County– northeast
 Fulton County – southeast
 Carroll County – west
 Paulding County – northwest

Demographics

2000 census
As of the census of 2000, there were 92,174 people, 32,822 households, and 24,911 families residing in the county. The population density was 462 people per square mile. There were 34,825 housing units. The racial makeup of the county was 77.28% White, 18.51% Black or African American, 0.35% Native American, 1.17% Asian and 1.44% from two or more races. 2.86% of the population were Hispanic or Latino of any race.

There were 32,822 households, out of which 38.60% had children under the age of 18 living with them, 58.90% were married couples living together, 12.70% had a female householder with no husband present, and 24.10% were non-families. 18.40% of all households were made up of individuals, and 4.40% had someone living alone who was 65 years of age or older. The average household size was 2.78 and the average family size was 3.17.

In the county, the population was spread out, with 27.60% under the age of 18, 8.90% from 18 to 24, 33.50% from 25 to 44, 22.40% from 45 to 64, and 7.50% who were 65 years of age or older. The median age was 34 years. For every 100 females, there were 96.50 males. For every 100 females age 18 and over, there were 93.80 males.

The median income for a household in the county was $50,798, and the median income for a family was $54,082. Males had a median income of $38,204 versus $28,475 for females. The per capita income for the county was $21,172. About 5.70% of families and 7.80% of the population were below the poverty line, including 9.90% of those under age 18 and 7.50% of those age 65 or over.

2010 census
As of the 2010 United States Census, there were 132,403 people, 46,624 households, and 34,429 families residing in the county. The racial makeup of the county was 52.5% white, 39.5% black or African American, 1.4% Asian, 0.3% American Indian, 0.1% Pacific islander, 3.8% from other races, and 2.4% from two or more races. Those of Hispanic or Latino origin made up 8.4% of the population. In terms of ancestry, 13.1% were Subsaharan African, 9.1% were American, 8.6% were Irish, 7.8% were German, and 7.6% were English.

Of the 46,624 households, 42.6% had children under the age of 18 living with them, 50.9% were married couples living together, 17.3% had a female householder with no husband present, 26.2% were non-families, and 21.5% of all households were made up of individuals. The average household size was 2.81 and the average family size was 3.27. The median age was 35.0 years.

The median income for a household in the county was $55,852 and the median income for a family was $62,977. Males had a median income of $45,424 versus $37,120 for females. The per capita income for the county was $24,515. About 8.8% of families and 11.3% of the population were below the poverty line, including 15.5% of those under age 18 and 10.3% of those age 65 or over.

2020 census

As of the 2020 United States Census, there were 144,237 people, 48,899 households, and 32,898 families residing in the county.

Economy

Per Capita Income Growth for Douglas County:

Douglas County is part of the greater Appalachia region, is served by the Appalachian Regional Commission, and is currently a transitional economy.

Parks and recreation
 Sweetwater Creek State Park is host to the ruins of a Civil War-era mill destroyed in General Sherman's campaign through Georgia.
 Hunter Park is located within the city limits of Douglasville, and it is home to the majority of the sports events held in Douglas County. It is home to the Douglas County Boys and Girls Club.
 Deer Lick Park is located in the northeast corner of the county and is the third-largest park in the county. It is also home to sporting events.
 Woodrow Wilson Park and Lithia Springs Girls Ball Field are located in Lithia Springs next to Sweetwater Creek. The ballfield has flooded during heavy rain storms.
 Boundary Waters Aquatic Center opened in July 2005 in the southeastern section of the county, and it is home to the Douglas County swim team, the Stingrays. The center also provides aquatic therapy and swim lessons to the county's citizens for a low fee. Residents outside the county can use the center as well for a slightly higher fee. Boundary Waters Park features 9 miles of trails open to hikers, joggers, bicyclists and equestrians.

Other parks in the county include:
 Post Road Park
 Clinton Nature Preserve
 Bill Arp Park
 Fairplay Park
 Winston Park
 Mount Carmel Ball Field
 Dog River Park/Reservoir

Government
The exception is the Douglas County Board of Education, located adjacent to Hunter Park. The Douglas County Chamber of Commerce is located in downtown Douglasville.

The county courthouse was constructed in 1997–98 and opened in 1998 after the county services needed a new courthouse for the ever-growing and changing county. The services prior to the opening were scattered all over downtown Douglasville in seven or eight office buildings. The old Douglas County courthouse, built in 1956, remains in downtown and is now used as a museum and a satellite school for the University of West Georgia an institution of the University System of Georgia with the main campus located in the city of Carrollton in Carroll County, which is included in the Atlanta Metropolitan Area historically, a commercial center for several mostly rural counties in both Georgia and Alabama.

Douglas County is governed by the Douglas County Board of Commissioners with an elected chairman and commissioners from Douglas County's four districts.

Politics
In presidential elections, Douglas County had been a reliably Republican county between 1980 and 2004, voting Republican by a double-digit margin even in 1992, when Democrat Bill Clinton carried the state of Georgia. The county gave over 60% of the vote to Republican George W. Bush in both of his presidential runs.  The county has since become increasingly Democratic, voting for Barack Obama in both 2008 and 2012, Hillary Clinton in 2016 and Joe Biden in 2020.

Law enforcement
Douglas County law enforcement is handled by the Douglas County Sheriffs Department. Inside Douglasville city limits, law enforcement is handled by the Douglasville Police Department.

Education

Douglas County is served by the Douglas County School System. Based in Douglasville, it operates 20 Elementary Schools, 8 Middle Schools, 5 High Schools, a Performance Learning Center and numerous private academies, .

Douglas County (Lithia Springs) is home to a regional academic center of Mercer University, which provides educational programs and extended learning opportunities for working adults.  In addition, the county has a campus of West Georgia Technical College, formerly West Central Technical College (main campus in Waco, Georgia); the college provides programs for those seeking higher education in technical fields, as well as adult education and GED classes.  The county also is home to Tanner Technical Institute, Strayer University, and Georgia Highlands College.

Media
The newspaper that serves the Douglas County area is the Douglas County Sentinel, a paper that circulates three days a week:  Wednesday, Friday and Sunday. The paper has been in circulation since 1902.  It now relies on its website for breaking news.

The county also has a secondary paper that circulates on Wednesday, the Douglas Neighbor, a paper that is run by the publisher of the Marietta Daily Journal.  This paper is delivered free of charge, supported by advertising.

The county also has a monthly magazine called Chapel Hill News & Views and Villa Rica News & Views that delivers to 39,000 homes and businesses ranging from Villa Rica to Lithia Springs and everywhere in between. It also includes a local yellow pages. The company's website covers a wide range of local information as well.

The county is also well-served by online media. Home Rule News launched in 2009 and covers Douglas County as part of its Greater West Metro Atlanta territory. All On Georgia-Douglas which is the newest and fastest growing digital news outlet in the county. Douglasville Patch launched in 2010 and focuses on countywide news and extensive crime coverage. The Douglasville Menu launched in 2015 and focuses on the retail, economic and development news of the city and county with some community and events news as well. The Douglasville Menu is part of The City Menus which began solely as The Carrollton Menu.

The Atlanta Journal-Constitution also serves readers of Douglas County, seven days a week, with its largest paper on Sunday.

Douglas County is served by the Atlanta television market, but has a small information TV channel on cable, DCTV 23. The station broadcasts board meetings and special events, classified job listings, and original shows: Gesundheit, Douglas County Living, Insights, District Dialogue, Legally Speaking, dctv23 Presents, Storytime at the Library, Pet Pause, and the "Friday Night Drive-in Movie".

Transportation

Major highways

  Interstate 20
  U.S. Route 78
  U.S. Route 278
  State Route 5
  State Route 6
  State Route 8
  State Route 8 Connector
  State Route 61
  State Route 70
  State Route 92
  State Route 154
  State Route 166
  State Route 402 (unsigned designation for I-20)

Other roads
 Lee Road: Runs through the eastern portion of the county in the Lithia Springs area. The road intersects I-20, begins at Fairburn Road (State Highway 92) in the south and terminates at S. Sweetwater Rd north of I-20.
 Post Road: Runs through the western portion of Douglas County through the Winston area. The road begins at the southern border with Carroll County, and runs north, intersects I-20 and ends at Bankhead Highway (US Route 78).
 Chapel Hill Road: begins at I-20 (road continues north as Campbellton St.) and runs south to Dorsett Shoals Road, ending at SR 166.
 Douglas Boulevard runs from Chapel Hill Rd. at I-20 to SR 5 (Bill Arp Rd.), and from there to Bright Star Road. This road passes Douglasville's Arbor Place Mall.
 Kings Highway runs south from SR 5 to Big A Road, and is host to many residential developments.
 Pope Road runs south, southeast looping from the Midway area of Fairburn Rd.(SR 92) and ends at Annewakee Rd.
 Annewakee Road runs south from Chapel Hill Rd. at Dorsett Shoals Rd. and ending at Fairburn Rd.(SR 92) and Pope Rd.
 Dorsett Shoals Road runs west from Chapel Hill Rd. at Annewakee Rd. to SR 5.
 Capps Ferry Road (a future state route) runs from the end of South Fulton Parkway to S.R. 166 connecting southern Douglas County to Atlanta.

Pedestrians and cycling

 Douglasville Running Trail
 Sweetwater Creek Park Trail
 Water Lily Dr
 Boundary Waters Park Trails

Rail
Historically, the Southern Railway ran several daily passenger trains, including the Kansas City-Florida Special, the Sunnyland and an Atlanta-Birmingham section of the Piedmont Limited, making flag or signal stops in Austell and Douglasville. The last trains made stops in 1967. Today, the nearest passenger service is Amtrak's Crescent'' in Atlanta, 21 miles east of Lithia Springs.

Healthcare

Douglas County is served by Wellstar Douglas Hospital

Communities

Cities
 Austell (part)
 Douglasville
 Villa Rica (part)

Census-designated place
 Lithia Springs

Unincorporated communities

 Beulah
 Bill Arp
 Chapel Hill
 Fairplay
 Hannah
 McWhorter
 Tributary
 White City
 Winston

In popular culture
 The county has become a hub for the film industry, serving as some of the state's most popular filming locations. Projects that have filmed exclusively in, or in part of, Douglas County include the Academy Award-winning Driving Miss Daisy, Smokey and the Bandit, Six Pack, Randy and the Mob, Zombieland, Killers, Killing Season, The Hunger Games: Catching Fire, The Founder, The Hunger Games: Mockingjay - Part I, Million Dollar Arm, Kill the Messenger, All Eyez on Me, Logan Lucky, Table 19, and The House with a Clock in Its Walls.
 Television series to film in the county include The Walking Dead, Necessary Roughness, Stranger Things, Matlock (TV series), Finding Carter, MacGyver, Stan Against Evil, and MTV's Scream.

See also

 National Register of Historic Places listings in Douglas County, Georgia
List of counties in Georgia
 New Manchester in east Douglas County, Georgia

References
Specific

General
 (1994–2002). Roadside Georgia: Archives of Douglas County. Retrieved December 23, 2004.
 Carl Vinson Institute of Government, UGA Retrieved March 2006.

External links
 CelebrateDouglasCounty.com
 Douglas County Website
 Douglas County School System
 douglascountygeorgia.com
 southeastroads.com/georgia
 Losing Georgia: The Douglas Story
 All About Douglas County Taxes
 Douglas County historical marker

 
1870 establishments in Georgia (U.S. state)
Georgia (U.S. state) counties
Douglas
Counties of Appalachia
Populated places established in 1870
Majority-minority counties in Georgia